Søren Skals Andreasen (born 13 March 1996) is a Danish footballer who plays for Aarhus Fremad, as a striker.

Club career

Esbjerg fB
Andreasen was a big talent and joined Esbjerg fB from Starup IF at the age of 14. He was on a trial at Tottenham Hotspur in October 2013, however without getting offered any contract. In last game of 2014 for the U19 squad, he suffered a very bad anterior cruciate ligament injury that kept him out for 10 months. However, he signed a new one-year contract with Esbjerg in February 2015, that would be valid from 1 July 2015.

He played his first official match for Esbjerg on 20 March 2016 against Brøndby IF, where he came on the pitch from the bench for the last minutes. He left the club at the end of the season.

ÍBV
After leaving Esbjerg, Andreasen began training with FC Fredericia. One month later, he signed with Icelandic club ÍBV.

Return to Denmark
On 1 February 2017 it was confirmed, that Andreasen had signed with amateur club Kolding IF.

References

1996 births
Living people
Danish men's footballers
Esbjerg fB players
Soren Andreasen
Aarhus Fremad players
Danish Superliga players
Soren Andreasen
Association football forwards
Danish expatriate men's footballers
Danish expatriate sportspeople in Iceland
Expatriate footballers in Iceland
Middelfart Boldklub players
People from Haderslev Municipality
Sportspeople from the Region of Southern Denmark